was one of the founders of Canon Inc. He established Canon in 1937 along with Goro Yoshida, Saburo Uchida and Takeo Maeda.

Biography
In 1942, Takeshi Mitarai, became president of the company. He was an obstetrician by profession. He had been the auditor of Precision Optical Industry before assuming the presidency. Even earlier, Mitarai had established Mitarai Obstetrics and Gynaecology Hospital in Mejiro, Tokyo.

References

Japanese business executives
Japanese obstetricians
1901 births
1984 deaths
20th-century Japanese physicians
Japanese company founders
Canon (company) people